Benson may refer to:

Animals
Benson (fish), largest common carp caught in Britain

Places

Geography

Canada
Rural Municipality of Benson No. 35, Saskatchewan; rural municipality
Benson, Saskatchewan; hamlet

United Kingdom
Benson, Oxfordshire

United States
Benson, Arizona
Benson (Amtrak station) in Benson, Arizona
Benson, Illinois
Benson, Louisiana
Benson, Maryland (disambiguation) 
Benson, Michigan
Benson, Minnesota
Benson, New York
Benson, North Carolina
Benson, Pennsylvania
Benson, Utah
Benson, Vermont, a New England town
Benson (CDP), Vermont, the main village in the town
Benson, Wisconsin
Benson County, North Dakota
Benson Lake, a lake in California
Benson neighborhood (Omaha, Nebraska)
Benson Township, Minnesota

Education
Benson High School (disambiguation)
Benson Idahosa University, private Christian university in Benin City, Nigeria
Benson Polytechnic High School, public high school in Portland, Oregon
Florence C. Benson Elementary School, historic school building for African-American students, Columbia, South Carolina
J.E. Benson Public School, former elementary school in Windsor, Ontario, Canada
James Benson Dudley High School, Greensboro, North Carolina
Mount Benson Elementary School (Nanaimo), public elementary school in Nanaimo, British Columbia
Roanoke-Benson High School, comprehensive high school located at 208 West High Street, in Roanoke, Illinois
Omaha Benson High School Magnet, Benson, Nebraska

Structures
Benson (Amtrak station), in Benson, Arizona
Benson Block, listed on the National Register of Historic Places in Wapello County, Iowa
Benson Building (Ottumwa, Iowa), listed on the National Register of Historic Places in Wapello County, Iowa
Benson Hotel, in Portland, Oregon
Benson House (disambiguation)
Benson Tower (disambiguation)
Benson Water Tower, water tower located on Clayton Street in Benson, Illinois

Media and entertainment
Benson (TV series), American sitcom (1979–1986)
Benson Dunwoody, a fictional character from the Cartoon Network animated series Regular Show

Military
Benson-class destroyer, World War II-era U.S. Navy ship class
RAF Benson, Royal Air Force station near Benson, Oxfordshire, England

People
Benson (given name)
Benson (surname)

Products, companies, and brands
Benson & Hedges, British brand of cigarettes
Benson International, American custom trailer and body business belonging to International Industries
Benson Records, American record label (1902–2001)
Kleinwort Benson, former merchant bank based in London, sometimes known as Bensons

Others

Benson (fish) (1984–2009), "Britain's biggest and best-loved" common carp
Benson Medal awarded by the Royal Society of Literature
Benson Syndicate, American 19th century organized crime group
Benson's syndrome, a disease also known as posterior cortical atrophy

Litigation
Benson v. Alverson, the Minnesota Supreme Court ruled that a state law limiting marriage to persons of the opposite sex did not violate the U.S. Constitution
Benson v SA Mutual Life, an important case in South African contract law, particularly in the area of claims for specific performance
Crowell v. Benson, 285 U.S. 22 (1932), United States Supreme Court approved the adjudication of private rights by an administrative agency, not an Article III court
Gottschalk v. Benson, a United States Supreme Court case on the patentability of computer software or algorithms (1972)
Pharaoh v. Benson (Montauk Point land claim), three lawsuits brought by Chief Wyandank Pharaoh, nephew of the Stephen Talkhouse

See also
Mount Benson (disambiguation)
Justice Benson (disambiguation)